Neyuk-e Sofla (also Romanized as Neyūk-e Soflá; also known as Neyūk) is a village in Nadushan Rural District of Nadushan District of Meybod County, Yazd province, Iran. At the 2006 National Census, its population was 90 in 30 households, when it was in Khezrabad District of Ashkezar County. The following census in 2011 counted 150 people in 52 households.

After the census, Nadushan Rural District was raised to the status of a district within Meybod County and divided into two rural districts and the city of Nadushan. The latest census in 2016 showed a population of 112 people in 34 households; it was the largest village in its rural district.

References 

Meybod County

Populated places in Yazd Province

Populated places in Meybod County